Erin Marie Evans is an author, and former editor for Wizards of the Coast.

Biography
Erin M. Evans earned a degree in anthropology from Washington University in St. Louis.

Evans wrote the Forgotten Realms novels The God Catcher (February 2010), Brimstone Angels (November 2011), Brimstone Angels: Lesser Evils (December 2012), as well as the short story The Resurrection Agent featured in the Realms of the Dead Anthology (January 2010). Evans wrote the novel The Adversary for The Sundering, a fictional event set in the expanded Dungeons & Dragons universe.

Awards
Evans is a 2012 SCRIBE award winner for best original novel in the speculative fiction category.

Bibliography
 Realms of the Dead: A Forgotten Realms Anthology (January 2010) 
 The God Catcher (February 2010)
 Brimstone Angels (November 2011)
 Brimstone Angels: Lesser Evils (December 2012)
 The Adversary: The Sundering, Book III (December 2013)
 Brimstone Angels: Fire in the Blood (October 2014)
 Ashes of the Tyrant (December 2015)
 The Devil You Know (October 2016)

References

External links
Erin Evans homepage

21st-century American novelists
21st-century American women writers
American fantasy writers
American women novelists
Living people
Washington University in St. Louis alumni
Women science fiction and fantasy writers
Year of birth missing (living people)